Thomas Wise (c. 1605 – 18 March 1641) of Sydenham in Devon, was an English politician who sat in the House of Commons of England  at various times between 1625 and 1641.

Biography
Wise was the son of Sir Thomas Wise by his wife Margaret Stafford, daughter of Robert Stafford of Stowford, Devon. His father had been an MP and had built houses at Mount Wise at Stoke Damerel and at Sydenham. In 1625 Wise was nominated by Robert Rolle (died 1633) of Heanton Satchville, Petrockstowe, Devon, as a Member of Parliament for his pocket borough of  Callington, which manor had been acquired by him in 1601. Thus in 1625 he served in the Useless Parliament. He was then elected MP for Bere Alston in the parliaments of King Charles of 1625, 1626 and 1628 to 1629.  Wise inherited the family estates on the death of his father in 1629. He was High Sheriff of Devon in 1638.
 
In April 1640, Wise was elected Member of Parliament for Devon for the Short Parliament. He was re-elected in November 1640 for the Long Parliament but died in 1641. He was succeed as MP for Devon by his brother in law Sir Samuel Rolle.
  
Wise married Lady Mary Chichester, daughter of Edward Chichester, 1st Viscount Chichester of Carrickfergus in Ireland, of Eggesford in Devon, by whom he had two children:
Edward Wise (1632–1675), of Sydenham, three times MP for Okehampton, 1659, 1660 and 1661–1675.
Margery Wise, who married Sir John Molesworth, 2nd Baronet (1635–1716) of Pencarrow in Cornwall.

References

1641 deaths
Members of the Parliament of England for Callington
High Sheriffs of Devon
English MPs 1625
English MPs 1626
English MPs 1628–1629
English MPs 1640 (April)
English MPs 1640–1648
Year of birth unknown
Year of birth uncertain
Members of the Parliament of England for Bere Alston
Members of the Parliament of England (pre-1707) for Devon